The Rest of the Dream is the 1990 album from the Nitty Gritty Dirt Band.

Track listing
"From Small Things (Big Things One Day Come)" (Bruce Springsteen) – 3:56
"Waiting on a Dark Eyed Girl'" (Ron Davies) – 3:12
"Junior's Grill" (Jim Photoglo, Vince Melamed, Jimmy Ibbotson) – 3:08
"Blow Out The Stars, Turn Off The Moon" (Bobby Braddock) – 3:52
"The Rest of the Dream" (John Hiatt) – 4:36
"Just Enough Ashland City" (John Hiatt) – 3:56
"Hillbilly Hollywood" (Jim Photoglo, Vince Melamed) – 2:55
"Snowballs" (Bob Garshelis, Kim Tribble, Jimmie Fadden) – 4:07
"Wishing Well" (Jeff Hanna, Jimmy Ibbotson, Jimmie Fadden, Bob Carpenter) – 3:30
"You Made Life Good Again" (Bob DiPiero, Steve Seskin) – 3:00

Personnel
The Band
Jeff Hanna – lead, harmony and background vocals, electric lead and acoustic 6 & 12 string and national guitars, washboard
Jimmy Ibbotson – lead and harmony vocals, mandolin, acoustic guitar
Jimmie Fadden – drums, harmonica, jaw harp, background vocals
Bob Carpenter – piano, harmony and background vocals, accordion, keyboards

Contributing Musicians
Jerry Douglas – lap steel, dobro
Paul Franklin – steel guitar
Mike Henderson – electric slide guitar, electric guitar, big note tremolo guitar
Josh Leo – electric guitar
Randy Scruggs – electric guitar, acoustic guitar, Bill Lloyd's 12-string Rickenbacker, banjo
Glenn Worf – bass, upright bass
Jim Photoglo – background vocals
Harry Stinson – background vocals

References
All information is from album liner notes unless otherwise noted.

Nitty Gritty Dirt Band albums
1990 albums
MCA Records albums